Leona Gom (born 1946) is a Canadian poet and novelist. Born on an isolated farm in northern Alberta, she received her B.Ed. and M.A. from the University of Alberta in Edmonton.  She has published six books of poetry and eight novels and has won both the Canadian Authors Association Award for her poetry collection Land of the Peace in 1980 and the Ethel Wilson Fiction Prize for her novel Housebroken in 1986.

She taught for many years at Douglas College, Kwantlen College, the University of Alberta and the University of British Columbia.  For about ten years she edited the award-winning magazine Event. She held writer-in-residencies at the University of Alberta, the University of Lethbridge and the University of Winnipeg.

Her work has been included in many journals and over fifty anthologies, and five of her books have been translated into other languages. Her novel The Y Chromosome has been optioned for a movie and has been used as a text in both women's studies and sociology courses in Canada and the U.S. Her latest novel is The Exclusion Principle (Sumach Press, 2009). Quill & Quire calls it "an entertaining read, in which the quotidian world of marriage and the exotic field of astronomy mesh."

The Leona Gom Archive is housed at the University of Calgary.

Bibliography

Fiction
Housebroken (Edmonton: NeWest, 1986) and (Toronto: Paperjacks, 1989)
Zero Avenue (Vancouver: Douglas & McIntyre, 1989) and (In Europe: Orlanda Frauenverlag, 1991 and Fischer Paperbacks, 1984)
The Y Chromosome (Toronto: Sumach/Second Story, 1990) and (Montreal: Alire Press, 2000)
After-Image: A Vicky Bauer Mystery (Toronto: Sumach/Second Story, 1996) and (In USA: St. Martin's Press, 1996) and (In Germany: Fischer Paperbacks, 2000)
Double Negative: A Vicky Bauer Mystery (Toronto: Sumach/Second Story, 1998) and (In Germany: Fischer Paperbacks, 2000)
Freeze Frame: A Vicky Bauer Mystery (Toronto: Sumach/Second Story, 1999) and (In Germany: Fischer Paperbacks, 2000)
Hating Gladys (Toronto: Sumach, 2002)
The Exclusion Principle (Toronto: Sumach, 2009)

Poetry
Kindling (Fredericton: Fiddlehead,1972)
The Singletree (Victoria: Sono Nis, 1975)
Land of the Peace (Saskatoon: Thistledown, 1980)
Northbound (Saskatoon: Thistledown, 1984)
Private Properties (Victoria: Sono Nis, 1986)
The Collected Poems (Victoria: Sono Nis, 1991)
Justice (Something: Some Thing, 19something)

References

1946 births
Canadian mystery writers
Canadian women novelists
Canadian women poets
Living people
Women mystery writers
20th-century Canadian novelists
21st-century Canadian novelists
20th-century Canadian poets
21st-century Canadian poets
20th-century Canadian women writers
21st-century Canadian women writers